Rabab may refer to:

Music
Rabāb or rebab, a bowed string instrument
Rubab (instrument) or rabab, a Central Asian plucked instrument

People
Rabab Abdulhadi (born 1955), American professor, activist, and author
Rabab Eid (born 1990), Egyptian freestyle wrestler
Rabab Fetieh, Saudi professor of orthodontics
Rabab Hashim (born 1992), Pakistani television actress

See also
Rababe Arafi (born 1991), Moroccan middle-distance runner